The Brigelser Hörner is a mountain massif in the Glarus Alps, and a range overlooking Breil/Brigels and Trun in canton of Graubünden. To its northern side above Val Frisal lies a nameless firn field. They are connected to the north by the saddle Barcun risal Sut with Piz Frisal and Piz Durschin at the border to canton of Glarus.

It consists of the following peaks, from west to east:
Cap Grond, 3195 m
Cavistrau Grond, 3251 m
Cavistrau Pign, 3219 m
Piz Tumpiv, 3100 m

In a broader sense, the following peaks are also part of the Hörner:
Piz Dadens, 2772 m
Piz Dado, 2698 m

References

Mountains of the Alps
Alpine three-thousanders
Mountains of Switzerland
Mountains of Graubünden